The Daugava or Western Dvina is a large river rising in the Valdai Hills of Russia that flows through Belarus and Latvia into the Gulf of Riga of the Baltic Sea. It rises close to the source of the Volga. It is a westward-flowing river, tracing out a great south-bending curve as it passes through northern Belarus.

Latvia's capital, Riga, bridges the river's estuary four times.

Geography

Tributaries 

The following rivers are tributaries to the river Daugava (from source to mouth):

Left: Mezha, Kasplya, Dysna, Laucesa, Berezauka, Eglona, Pikstere, Ņega
Right: Usvyacha, Palata, Drysa, Dubna, Aiviekste, Pērse, Dīvaja, Ogre

Etymology 

According to Max Vasmer's Etymological Dictionary, the toponym Dvina cannot stem from a Uralic language; instead, it possibly comes from an Indo-European word which used to mean river or stream. The name Dvina resembles strongly Danuvius which itself derived from the Proto-Indo-European *dānu, meaning "large river".

History 

Humans have settled at the mouth of the Daugava and along the shores of the Gulf of Riga for millennia, initially participating in a hunter-gatherer economy and utilizing the waters of the Daugava estuary for fishing and gathering. Beginning around the sixth century CE, Viking explorers crossed the Baltic Sea and entered the Daugava River, navigating upriver into the Baltic interior.

In medieval times, the Daugava was part of the trade route from the Varangians to the Greeks, an important route for the transport of furs from the north and of Byzantine silver from the south. The Riga area, inhabited by the Finnic-speaking Livs, became a key location of settlement and defence of the mouth of the Daugava at least as early as the Middle Ages, as evidenced by the now destroyed fort at Torņakalns on the west bank of the Daugava in present-day Riga. Since the Late Middle Ages, the western part of the Daugava basin has come under the rule of various peoples and states; for example, the Latvian town of Daugavpils variously came under papal, Slavonic, Polish, German, and Russian rule until the restoration of the Latvian independence in 1990 at the end of the Cold War.

Settlements 

The following are select cities and towns built along the Daugava:

Russia

Belarus

Latvia

Environment 

The river began experiencing environmental deterioration in the Soviet era due to collective agriculture (producing considerable adverse water pollution runoff) and hydroelectric power projects.

Water quality 
Upstream of the Latvian town of Jekabpils, the river's pH has a characteristic value of about 7.8 (slight alkaline). In this area, the concentration of ionic calcium is around 43 milligrams per liter, nitrate is about 0.82 milligrams per liter, ionic phosphate is 0.038 milligrams per liter, and oxygen saturation is 80%. The high nitrate and phosphate load of the Daugava has contributed to the extensive buildup of phytoplankton biomass in the Baltic Sea; the Oder and Vistula rivers also contribute to the high nutrient loading of the Baltic.

In Belarus, water pollution of the Daugava is considered moderately severe, with the chief sources being treated wastewater, fish-farming, and agricultural chemical runoff (such as herbicides, pesticides, nitrates, and phosphates).

References

Further reading 
 
Francis W. Carter and David Turnock. 2002. Environmental problems of East Central Europe. 442 pages Google eBook

External links
 Daugava River photos at flickr

 
 
International rivers of Europe
Rivers of Belarus
Rivers of Latvia
Gulf of Riga
Rivers of Smolensk Oblast
Rivers of Tver Oblast
Rivers of Vitebsk Region
Belarus–Latvia border